A Hessian is an inhabitant of the German state of Hesse.

Hessian may also refer to:

Named from the toponym 
Hessian (soldier), eighteenth-century German regiments in service with the British Empire
Hessian (boot), a style of boot
Hessian fabric, coarse woven material
Hessian fly or barley midge, a species of fly (thought to be introduced by Hessian soldiers)
Hessian dialects, West Central German group of dialects
Hessian crucible, a type of ceramic crucible
Hessian Cup, a regional cup competition in German football

Named for Otto Hesse 
Hessian matrix, in mathematics, is a matrix of second partial derivatives
Hessian affine region detector, a feature detector used in the fields of computer vision and image analysis
Hessian automatic differentiation
Hessian equations, partial differential equations (PDEs) based on the Hessian matrix
Hessian pair or Hessian duad in mathematics
Hessian form of an elliptic curve
Hessian group
 Hessian polyhedron
Glossary of classical algebraic geometry § Hessian, other mathematical objects called Hessian

Other uses 
Hessian (Web service protocol)
The Hessian, a 1972 novel by Howard Fast

People with the name 
Patrick J. Hessian (1928–2007), United States Army officer
Stephen Hessian (1891–1962), Canadian lawyer and political figure
Toby Hessian (born 1969), British rower

See also 

Language and nationality disambiguation pages